Templers (postcode 5371) is a small town on the Horrocks Highway north of Gawler, South Australia. The town was named after William Templer who, with his wife Martha, was the licensee of the North Star hotel in the area from 1846 to 1878.

The Templers Primary School opened in 1873, but has since closed.

The Mount Bethel Wesleyan Jubilee chapel was built in 1863 (completed 1864) by a people who had been meeting regularly in homes and sheds for worship since the early 1850s. It was initially part of the Gawler circuit. From 1870 it was part of a circuit consisting of Templers, Wasleys, Freeling and Sheaoak Log, with Stockport added from 1880.

References

 North Star Hotel, Kudnarto
 Templers, Geoscience Australia 
 Templers, Placenames

Towns in South Australia